The 2018–19 EFL Trophy, known as the Checkatrade Trophy for sponsorship reasons, was the 36th season in the history of the competition, a knock-out tournament for English football clubs in League One and League Two of the English football system, and also including 16 Premier League and Championship "Academy teams" with Category One status.

Lincoln City were the defending champions, but were eliminated in the second round by Accrington Stanley. Portsmouth won the competition for the first time, defeating Sunderland in front of an EFL Trophy record attendance in the final.

Participating clubs
48 clubs from League One and League Two.
16 invited Category One Academy teams.

Of the sixteen invited Category One academies, fourteen competed in the 2017–18 competition; only Arsenal and Wolverhampton Wanderers did not participate. Arsenal rejected an invitation to compete in each of the previous two tournaments, while Wolves were not invited to compete in 2017–18 competition after fielding a side in the 2016–17 edition.

Reading and Sunderland's academy sides missed out after participation in the previous two years; Sunderland's first team competed for the first time since the 1987–88 competition, however, following their relegation to League One. Barnsley and Burton Albion both returned to the competition after relegation; they last competed in the 2015–16 season, when Barnsley won the trophy.

Macclesfield Town competed for the first time since the 2011–12 edition, following their promotion from the National League. Fellow promoted side Tranmere Rovers returned after a four year hiatus.

Liverpool and Manchester United both rejected an invitation to compete for the third successive season.

Eligibility criteria for players
For EFL Clubs
Minimum of four qualifying outfield players in their starting XI. A qualifying outfield player will be one who meets any of the following requirements:
Any player who started the previous or following first-team fixture
Any player who is in the top 10 players at the club, who have made the most starting appearances in league and domestic cup competitions that season
Any player with 40 or more first-team appearances in their career
Any player on loan from a Premier League club or any EFL Category One Academy club.
A club can play any eligible goalkeeper in the competition

For invited teams
Minimum of six players in the starting line-up who played at under-21 level, as at 30 June 2018.
Teams may only include two players on the team sheet, aged over 21, who have made forty or more senior appearances, as at 30 June 2018.
A senior appearance will be defined as having played in a professional first-team fixture. A non-playing substitute does not count.

Competition format
Group stage
 Sixteen groups of 4 teams would be organised on a regionalised basis.
 All groups would include one invited club.
 All clubs would play each other once, either home or away (Academies play all group matches away from home).
 Clubs would be awarded three points for a win and one point for a draw.
 In the event of a drawn game (after 90 minutes), a penalty shootout would be held with the winning team earning an additional point.
 The top two teams would progress to the Knockout Stage.

Knockout stage
 Round 2 and 3 of the competition would be drawn on a regionalised basis.
 In Round 2, the group winners should be seeded and the group runners-up shall be unseeded in the draw.
 In Round 2, teams who played in the same group as each other in the group stage would be kept apart from each other.

Group stage and Knockout rounds

Northern Section

Group A

Group B

Group C

Group D

Group E

Group F

Group G

Group H

Southern Section

Group A

Group B

Group C

Group D

Group E

Group F

Group G

Group H

Knockout Stage

Round 2
The round 2 draw took place on 16 November with ties due to be played from the week beginning 3 December. Teams were drawn in a regionalised format, with the proviso that no teams from the same Group Stage group can meet. To ensure this, group winners from groups A to D were drawn against group runners-up from groups E to H in the same section, and vice versa.  Teams listed 1st are at home and won their group in Round 1.

If scores are level after 90 minutes in Rounds 2, 3, and 4, the game will be determined by the taking of penalties.

Northern Section

Southern Section

Round 3
The draw for round 3 was held on Saturday, 8 December.  Northern and Southern section teams were still segregated this round and will be brought together in the next round (the quarter-finals).  No seeding is used from this point: all teams within their denoted section are in a blind draw.

Northern Section

Southern Section

Round 4 / Quarter-finals

Quarter-final pairings are determined by means of an unseeded draw.  There are no further segregated sections of the draw.

Semi-finals
The four winners from the quarter-finals will contest the semi-finals, with the pairings determined by an unseeded draw. Matches will be played as one leg, and will advance directly to penalties if the teams are tied after 90 minutes.

Final

The two winners from the semi-finals, Portsmouth and Sunderland, contested the final at Wembley Stadium on 31 March 2019. Portsmouth won 5–4 on penalties following a 2–2 draw after extra time to win their first EFL trophy.

References

External links

EFL Trophy
EFL Trophy
Trophy